Joanne Hélène Josephine "Joanneke" Kruijsen (10 January 1969 – 28 May 2016) was a Dutch politician and sustainability researcher. She was a member of the Labour Party and served in the House of Representatives between 2003 and 2006.

Career
Kruijsen was born on 10 January 1969 in Nijmegen. She grew up in Berg en Dal. She studied public administration and industrial design at Delft University of Technology between 1987 and 1994. Kruijsen subsequently attended the Open University in the Netherlands from 1994 to 1995 to study environmental management.

Kruijsen was elected in the 2003 Dutch general election for the Labour Party. She was a member of the House of Representatives between 30 January 2003 and 30 November 2006, not being a candidate in the 2006 Dutch general election. During her time in the House she was mainly concerned with environmental policy.

After her time in politics Kruijsen owned her own shop in sustainable clothing. In 2010 she moved to Scotland, where she became a researcher and later fellow at the Center for Understanding Sustainable Practice at Robert Gordon University in Aberdeen. At the Center she undertook research on behavioural change and sustainable practice.

She died in Huntly, Scotland on 28 May 2016.

References

1969 births
2016 deaths
Delft University of Technology alumni
Labour Party (Netherlands) politicians
Members of the House of Representatives (Netherlands)
People associated with Robert Gordon University
People from Nijmegen